Surahammar Municipality (Surahammars kommun) is a municipality in Västmanland County in central Sweden. Its seat is located in the town of Surahammar.

The municipality is located some 100 km west of Stockholm in the southern part of the mineral-rich Bergslagen region.

The municipality was formed in 1963 through the amalgamation of Ramnäs and Sura.

Localities 
 Ramnäs
 Surahammar (seat)
 Virsbo

History 
Steelmaking in this municipality was started on a larger scale in the 16th and 17th centuries when forges were built there. It was a new phenomenon to run forge mills separate from mining and pig iron production sites in Bergslagen. The mills were located in Virsbo, Ramnäs and Surahammar and pig iron was transported from mills further north, initially by horse-sledges in the winter. There was ample local supply of hydropower to run the forge hammers and timber to make charcoal. Later, when Strömsholm Canal was finished, it was used to ship finished products to Västerås and Stockholm for export. This restructuring process appears to have been driven by the need to secure access to hydropower and timber for the forges since both the mines and blast furnaces used up considerable amounts of resources in the production of pig iron.

Over time, the mills specialised and in Ramnäs the key product became iron chains – in modern days for the off-shore industry – and in Surahammar wheel-sets for the rail road industry and electro steels, both with ASEA as a major customer.

In Surahammar, Gustaf Eriksson developed the first combustion-engine automobile built in Sweden in 1897. It formed the basis for a new Swedish industry that was located in Södertälje under the name of Vagnfabriks-Aktiebolaget i Södertelge (renamed in 1906 to Vabis that later merged with Scania AB).

Today, the mills in Virsbo, Ramnäs and Surahammar have been transformed into modern industries with international owners.

Economy 
Industry in Surahammar includes:
 Surahammars Bruk AB - electrical steels
 Adtranz Wheelset AB - wheelsets for the railroad industry
 Metso Powdermet
 Scana Ramnäs AB
 Uponor Wirsbo AB
 Ruukki Sverige AB, Virsbo

Tourism 
The Strömsholm Canal has been restored and is a popular route for small yachts. One can navigate from Strömsholm Palace, one of the Royal Palaces in Sweden at lake Mälaren to Fagersta and Smedjebacken through several canal locks and lakes, a total distance of 100 km.

Ecomuseum Bergslagen gives an in-depth view of how the early industrialization evolved in the Bergslagen region. It consists of some 40 sites.

Riksdag elections

References

External links 

Surahammar Municipality - Official site
Strömsholm Canal - Official site
Surahammar Manor - Official site
Ecomuseum Bergslagen - Official site

Municipalities of Västmanland County